Kaho Sunami (角南果帆, Sunami Kaho; born 5 January 1993) is a Japanese handball player for Sony Semiconductor and the Japanese national team.

She participated at the 2017 World Women's Handball Championship.

References

1993 births
Living people
Japanese female handball players
Handball players at the 2018 Asian Games
Asian Games bronze medalists for Japan
Asian Games medalists in handball
Medalists at the 2018 Asian Games
Handball players at the 2020 Summer Olympics
21st-century Japanese women
20th-century Japanese women